Khaled Ghezzawi (born May 9, 1987) is a Libyan swimmer, who specialized in sprint freestyle events. Ghezzawi qualified for the men's 50 m freestyle at the 2004 Summer Olympics in Athens, by receiving a Universality place from FINA, in an entry time of 27.00. He challenged seven other swimmers in heat three, including 16-year-old Chris Hackel of Mauritius. He raced to sixth place in 27.55, just 0.55 of a second off his entry time. Ghezzawi failed to advance into the semifinals, as he placed seventy-first overall out of 86 swimmers in the preliminaries.

References

1987 births
Living people
Libyan male freestyle swimmers
Olympic swimmers of Libya
Swimmers at the 2004 Summer Olympics